This is a list of aircraft in the collection of the Pima Air & Space Museum in Tucson, Arizona.

The identity of an aircraft may be its civil registration or its military serial number. An aircraft may have had civil use following its retirement from the military; furthermore an aircraft may not be displayed with the same identification as is listed here. Aircraft formerly operated by the United States civilian agency NASA, while civil registered, are identified separately to the other former civil-registered aircraft in the collection.

The key to military identities is as follows:
 AAC: British Army Air Corps
 FiAF: Finnish Air Force
 LSK: Luftstreitkräfte der Nationalen Volksarmee – East German Air Force
 LW: Luftwaffe – Air Force of Nazi Germany
 MF: Marineflieger – German Navy air arm
 RAAF: Royal Australian Air Force
 RAF: Royal Air Force
 RCAF: Royal Canadian Air Force
 RN: Royal Navy
 RSAF: Royal Saudi Air Force
 SwAF: Swiss Air Force
 USAAC: United States Army Air Corps
 USAAF: United States Army Air Forces
 USAF: United States Air Force
 USAr: United States Army
 USCG: United States Coast Guard
 USMC: United States Marine Corps
 USN: United States Navy
 WLOP: Wojska Lotnicze i Obrony Powietrznej – Polish Air Force

Aircraft

Lighter-than-air craft

Drones, missiles and unmanned aircraft

Partial aircraft

References

Pima Air and Space Museum
Pima Air and Space Museum